"The Making of Private Pike" is the second episode of the ninth and final series of the British comedy series Dad's Army. It was originally transmitted on 9 October 1977.

Synopsis
Mainwaring now has his own staff car. Pike, still heady from his raspberryade binge, borrows it to drive his new girlfriend to the cinema in Eastgate. Pike's naive and immature nature ruins the date. On the way back, however, and nine miles from Walmington, it runs out of petrol. It takes Pike all night to push it back. It becomes appropriate for Wilson to have a serious word with the boy.

Cast

Arthur Lowe as Captain Mainwaring
John Le Mesurier as Sergeant Wilson
Clive Dunn as Lance Corporal Jones
John Laurie as Private Frazer
Arnold Ridley as Private Godfrey
Ian Lavender as Private Pike
Janet Davies as Mrs Pike
Bill Pertwee as ARP Warden Hodges
Frank Williams as Reverend Timothy Farthing
Edward Sinclair as The Verger
Jean Gilpin as Sylvia

Dad's Army (series 9) episodes
1977 British television episodes